O-Type may refer to:
 O-type asteroid
 O type blood
 O-type star
 O-type giant
 O-type main sequence star
 Subdwarf O star